Euro Tech Maritime Academy, is an educational institute in India dedicated for maritime education and training. Euro Tech Maritime Academy is situated on the outskirts of the city of Kochi. It is affiliated to Indian Maritime University and approved by Directorate General Of Shipping Govt of India, The institution offers extensive education and training in pre-sea and post-sea training for candidates ranging from cadets to officers.

About 
The institute was established in 2005 and was inaugurated by Chief Minister, Mr Oommen Chandy on 16 April 2005

Admissions 
Admissions for Euro Tech Maritime Academy B Tech Courses are based on All India level online exams conducted by Indian Maritime University. The preliminary round of entrance examinations are done online. Admissions for other courses are done after interview at the college campus.

Awards and achievements 
A1 Grading : Euro Tech Maritime Academy bagged A1 Grading from the Indian Register of Shipping. Its Indian Registrar of Shipping is the highest certification being granted by DG Shipping to maritime training institutes in the country as per stringent norms laid out by the DG Shipping.

Campus 
The campus is spread over a 10-acre (40,470 m2) area, with outdoor and indoor sports facilities like cricket,  basketball, tennis, carom etc. The campus is Wi-Fi enabled and has a swimming pool and a gym.

The college has a model ship on campus for training marine engineers.

The college has residential arrangements and hostel facility within the campus.

Departments 
The major departments are:
 Marine engineering
 Pre Sea Training

Courses 
The major courses offered are:
 B.Tech (Marine Engineering)
 Certificate Course in Maritime Catering ( CCMC )
 Pre-Sea training for Electro-Technical Officer (ETO)
 Orientation Courses for Catering Personnel (OCCP)
 General Purpose Rating (G.P Rating)
 MEO Class II Preparatory Course
 Advanced Fire Fighting (AFF)
 Personal Survival Techniques (PST)
 Basic and Advance STCW courses

References

External links 
 

Maritime colleges in India
Universities and colleges in Kochi
Educational institutions established in 2005
2005 establishments in Kerala